Brewed coffee is made by pouring hot water onto ground coffee beans, then allowing to brew. There are several methods for doing this, including using a filter, a percolator, and a French press. Terms used for the resulting coffee often reflect the method used, such as drip brewed coffee, filtered coffee, pour-over coffee, immersion brewed coffee, or simply coffee. Water seeps through the ground coffee, absorbing its constituent chemical compounds, and then passes through a filter. The used coffee grounds are retained in the filter, while the brewed coffee is collected in a vessel such as a carafe or pot.

History 

Paper coffee filters were invented in Germany by Melitta Bentz in 1908 and are commonly used for drip brew all over the world. In 1954 the first electric drip brewer, the Wigomat invented by Gottlob Widmann, was patented in Germany. Drip brew coffee makers largely replaced the coffee percolator in the 1970s due to the percolator's tendency to over-extract coffee, thereby making it bitter. One benefit of paper filters is that the used grounds and the filter may be disposed of together, without a need to clean the filter. Permanent filters are now also common, made of thin perforated metal sheets, fine plastic mesh or porous ceramics that restrain the grounds but allow the coffee to pass, thus eliminating the need to have to purchase separate filters which sometimes cannot be found in some parts of the world. These add to the maintenance of the machine but reduce overall cost and produce less waste.

Characteristics 

Brewing with a paper filter produces clear, light-bodied coffee. While free of sediments, such coffee is lacking in some of coffee's oils and essences; they have been trapped in the paper filter.  Metal filters do not remove these components.

It may be observed, especially when using a tall, narrow carafe, that the coffee at the bottom of the coffeepot is stronger than that at the top.  This is because less flavor is available for extraction from the coffee grounds as the brewing process progresses. A mathematical argument has been made that delivering comparable strength in two cups of coffee is nearly achieved using a Thue–Morse sequence of pours. This analysis prompted a whimsical article in the popular press.

There are several manual drip-brewing devices on the market, offering a little more control over brewing parameters than automatic machines, and which incorporate stopper valves and other innovations that offer greater control over steeping time and the proportion of coffee to water. There also exist small, portable, single-serving drip brew makers that only hold the filter and rest on top of a mug or cup, making them a popular option for backcountry campers and hikers. Hot water is poured in and drips directly into the cup. 

A less familiar form of drip brewing is the reversible or "flip" pot commonly known as Napoletana.

Cultural impact 

Filter coffee is central to Japanese coffee culture and connoisseurship.

In South India, filter coffee brewed at home is known as Kaapi and is a part of local culture. Most houses have a stainless-steel coffee filter and most shops sell freshly roasted and ground coffee beans. Some popular filter coffee brands include Mysore café, Hill coffee (Suresh healthcare), Cothas Coffee (Bangalore) and Narasu's Coffee (Salem). It is common in South India and Louisiana to add an additive called chicory to coffee to give it a unique taste and flavour.

Methods

There are a number of methods and pieces of equipment for making brewed coffee. 

Pour-over methods are popular ways of making specialty drip coffee. The method involves pouring water over a bed of coffee in a filter-lined conical chamber, such as the Chemex or the Hario V60. The filter can be with paper, cloth, or metal. The quality of the resulting coffee is extremely dependent on the technique of the user, with pour-over brewing being a popular method used in the World Brewers Cup.

Hario V60 
The V60 is a cone-shaped brewer, with ribs along the wall (to prevent the paper sticking and allowing air through) and a single large hole (to allow water to pass through unrestricted).  Hario began designing brewers in 1980, but the V60 was not released until 2004. The brewer received the Japanese Good Design Award in 2007 and is used by most of the winners in the World Brewers Cup. The design was adapted to create the Hario W60, a brewer with a flat-bottomed mesh filter, in partnership with 2013 World Barista Champion Pete Licata, to "address the concern baristas have with 'flat bed' brewing".

Cafetière du Belloy and Karlsbad-style coffee makers 

The Drip-O-lator is a coffee pot for making drip coffee patented in 1921 and in 1930 and manufactured in Massillon, Ohio, or Macon, Georgia, United States. The production of Drip-O-lators ceased in the middle of the twentieth century. The pots have become collectibles similar to bric-à-brac.

See also 

 Chemex
 Chorreador
 Coffeemaker
 Coffee bag
 Coffee percolator
 French press
 Indian filter coffee
 Instant coffee
 List of coffee drinks
 Trojan Room coffee pot
 Turkish coffee

References

External links 
 Hand Drip Coffee

Coffee preparation
Coffee culture
Coffee
sv:Kaffebryggare